Mallinella fulvipes is a species of spider in the family Zodariidae, found in the Ryukyu Islands.

References

External links 
 https://www.itis.gov/servlet/SingleRpt/SingleRpt?search_topic=Scientific_Name&search_value=Mallinella+fulvipes&search_kingdom=every&search_span=containing&categories=All&source=html&search_credRating=All

Zodariidae
Spiders of Asia
Spiders described in 1990